William Butler (December 2, 1822 – November 2, 1909) was a United States district judge of the United States District Court for the Eastern District of Pennsylvania.

Education and career

Born in Chester County, Pennsylvania, Butler read law to enter the bar in 1845. He was in private practice in West Chester, Pennsylvania and was district attorney of Harrisburg, Pennsylvania from 1856 to 1859. He was Presiding Judge of the Court of Common Pleas in Harrisburg from 1861 to 1879.

Federal judicial service

On February 12, 1879, Butler was nominated by President Rutherford B. Hayes to a seat on the United States District Court for the Eastern District of Pennsylvania vacated by Judge John Cadwalader. Butler was confirmed by the United States Senate on February 19, 1879, and received his commission the same day. Butler served in that capacity until his retirement from the bench on January 31, 1899.

Death
Butler died on November 2, 1909, in Chester County. He was interred at Oaklands Cemetery in West Chester.

His younger brother was Samuel Butler, who served as a Pennsylvania state representative and state treasurer.

References

1822 births
1909 deaths
Judges of the United States District Court for the Eastern District of Pennsylvania
United States federal judges appointed by Rutherford B. Hayes
19th-century American judges
People from Chester County, Pennsylvania
United States federal judges admitted to the practice of law by reading law
District attorneys in Pennsylvania
Burials at Oaklands Cemetery